Parallel Lives is a 2009 album by the Japanese rock band Nothing's Carved in Stone released on May 6, 2009. It reached No. 11 on the Japanese Oricon album charts.

Track listing

References 

2009 albums
Nothing's Carved in Stone albums